Elizabeth Spires (born May 1952 Lancaster, Ohio) is an American poet and university professor.

Early life and education 
Spires was raised in Circleville. She graduated from Vassar College and Johns Hopkins University.

Career 
Spires is a professor of English at Goucher College, where she holds a Chair for Distinguished Achievement. Her poems have appeared in The New Yorker, Poetry, American Poetry Review, The New Criterion, The Paris Review and many other literary magazines and anthologies.

Awards and honors 
She has been the recipient of the Amy Lowell Poetry Travelling Scholarship, a Whiting Award, a Guggenheim Fellowship, two fellowships from the National Endowment for the Arts, the Witter Bynner Prize from the American Academy of Arts and Letters, two Ohioana Book Awards, and the Maryland Author Award from the Maryland Library Association.

Selected works

Poetry

Children's books

Edited
 The Instant of Knowing: Lectures, Criticism and Occasional Prose by Josephine Jacobsen.

Anthologies

References

External links
 Audio: Elizabeth Spires reads You Have Flown to the Dangerous Country from The Wave-Maker (2008)
 Audio: Elizabeth Spires reads S n a i l from The Wave-Maker (2008)
 Interview: Elizabeth Spires Interview (2010) from KeepWriting.org
 Profile and Publication Info: The Whiting Foundation

1952 births
Goucher College faculty and staff
People from Lancaster, Ohio
Living people
Vassar College alumni
Johns Hopkins University alumni
American women poets
American women academics
21st-century American women